SIBOR may refer to:
 SIBOR, Singapore Interbank Offered Rate
 SIBOR, Saudi Interbank Offered Rate, also known as SAIBOR